Julien Palma (born ) is a French male  track cyclist. He won the bronze medal in the team sprint event at the 2013 UCI Track Cycling World Championships.

References

External links
 Profile at cyclingarchives.com

1993 births
Living people
French track cyclists
French male cyclists
Place of birth missing (living people)